The women's pole vault event at the 1999 All-Africa Games was held at the Johannesburg Stadium. It was the first time that this event was contested at the All-Africa Games.

Results

References

Athletics at the 1999 All-Africa Games